Friedrich August Frenzel (24 May 1842 – 27 August 1902) was a German mineralogist. He was born in a miner's family in Freiberg, Saxony. In 1861 he was awarded a scholarship which enabled him to study mineralogy at Bergakademie Freiberg. There he attracted the attention of August Breithaupt who asked him to help with organising the mineralogical collections of the academy and with testing mineral samples, and to assist in the professor's mineralogical research. In 1865 Frenzel finished his studies and was awarded the title of a mining inspector. From then on, he worked for 25 years as a chemist in the metallurgical laboratories. He also lectured at the Bergakademie.

One of his best known works is the mineralogical encyclopedia for the Kingdom of Saxony (Mineralogisches Lexicon Für Das Königreich Sachsen), which contains descriptions of 723 minerals found in Saxony, information on their physical properties and chemical compositions, and descriptions of the corresponding localities.

He died in Freiberg.

Works 

 Mineralogisches Lexicon Für Das Königreich Sachsen
 together with G. vom Rath: Über merkwürdige Verwachsungen von Quarzkrystallen auf Kalkspath von Schneeberg in Sachsen
 together with Heinrich Moehl, Hanns Bruno Geinitz, Oskar Schneider: X. Kaukasische Mineralien
 Leitfaden für den Unterricht in der Mineralogie an der Königlichen Bergschule zu Freiberg
 together with D. Köck: Leitfaden für den Unterricht in der Mineralogie an den Sächsischen Bergschulen zu Freiberg und Zwickau

Minerals first described by F. A. Frenzel 

 1870: Lithiophorite
 1871: Pucherite und Bismutoferrite (as Hypochlorit)
 1872: Heterogenite (Heterogenit-3R) und Miriquidite
 1881: Lautite
 1883: Rézbányit (also Rezbanyit, discredited in 1994, found to be a mixture of hammarite, krupkaite und cosalite)
 1887: Hohmannite
 1888: Amarantite
 1893: Cylindrite

References

External links 
 The Mineralogical Record - Frenzel, Friedrich August

German mineralogists
19th-century German chemists
1842 births
1902 deaths
Scientists from Freiberg